Rough Cut Comics is a Scottish comic book publisher based in Glasgow.

History

Ed Murphy, Colin Barr, David McBride and comic-book artist Jaeson Finn founded Rough Cut Comics in 1999 to  [..] create a publishing house to produce comic-book projects based upon - and to inspire - feature film and video game packages.

Rough Cut′s first title was The Surgeon, published in 2001. The Surgeon was based on a horror film script that never came to fruition. It sold more than 7.000 copies and has been translated into different languages, among them German, where it was published by Weissblech Comics, French and Italian.
Another comic based on horror films is the adaption of Brian Yuzna's Society; the current series is the sequel Society: Party Animal written by Colin Barr with art by Shelby Robertson for issue 1 and Neill Cameron for issue 2.

The title Freedom Collective, published in 2009, garnered praise from Grant Morrison and Alex Ross, and was mentioned by the Jack Kirby Collector and comic magazine Wizard, as well as becoming one of new distributor UKonDisplay’s biggest selling titles at their launch earlier that year. In July 2014, their GoodCopBadCop: Casebook#1 title won the True Believers Award for Best British BW Comic-book.

Creators
Apart from company founders Colin Barr and Jaeson Finn, Rough Cut Comics has featured works by Shelby Robertson, Neill Cameron, Joel Carpenter, Dave Alexander, Will Pickering, Luke Cooper, Garry McLaughlin, Alex Ronald, Curt Sibling and Derek Dow, among others.

Selected Titles
 GoodCopBadCop: Casebook#2
 GoodCopBadCop: Casebook#1
 Amanda Swan: The Hellfire Legacy
 Freedom Collective (one-shot)
 Compulsory Freedom Collective (trade paperback)
 Green Pages (b/w magazine)
 Rose Black Book 1 (Graphic Novel)
 Rose Black: Demon Seed (Graphic novel)
 Society
 Society: Party Animal 
 The Surgeon (mini-series)
 The Surgeon: Timelines (one-shot)

References

External links
 Homepage of Rough Cut Comics
 Rough Cut Comics at Facebook

British companies established in 1999
Lists of comics by publisher
Comic book publishing companies of Scotland
Comic book publishing companies of the United Kingdom
Publishing companies established in 1999
Companies based in Glasgow
1999 establishments in Scotland